Marthinus Grobler (born ), is a Zimbabwean rugby union player who played as fly-half.

Career
At club level, Grobler played for Birmingham Moseley.
He also represented Zimbabwe at the 1987 Rugby World Cup, being first capped on the pool stage match against Scotland. In the tournament, he scored 
7 penalties and converted 2 tries, with 25 points in aggregate. His last cap was during the test match against Ivory Coast in Casablanca, on 18 June 1994, earning 7 caps and 25 points in his overall career.

References

External links
Marthinus Grobler international stats

1960s births
Living people
Year of birth uncertain
Zimbabwean rugby union players
Rugby union fly-halves
Zimbabwean expatriate sportspeople in the United Kingdom
White Zimbabwean sportspeople
Moseley Rugby Football Club players